Matthew Sullivan was an architect.

Matthew or Matt Sullivan may also refer to:

Matt Sullivan (1857–1937), Chief Justice of California
Matt Sullivan character in Blackwoods
Matt Sullivan, character in 40 Days and 40 Nights

See also
Matthew O'Sullivan (disambiguation)